Switzerland national hockey team may refer to:

 Switzerland men's national field hockey team
 Switzerland men's national ice hockey team
 Switzerland men's national junior ice hockey team
 Switzerland men's national under-18 ice hockey team
 Switzerland women's national ice hockey team
 Switzerland women's national under-18 ice hockey team
 Switzerland men's national inline hockey team
 Switzerland national roller hockey team